Lago della Serraia is a lake in Trentino, Italy. At an elevation of 974 m, its surface area is 0.45 km².

Lakes of Trentino-Alto Adige/Südtirol